Veps National Volost (Vepsskaya natsionalnaya volost) was a municipal autonomy (a volost) of North Vepses in Prionezhsky District of the Republic of Karelia, Russia.  The autonomy was established on January 20, 1994, and it was discontinued in 2004.  Its territorial centre was the village (selo) of Shyoltozero.  The volost's population was 3,166 in the 2002 Census with a Veps population of 1,202. The volost extended over the same territory as the Shyoltozero District from the 1930s to the 1950s.

The volost was municipally divided into three rural settlements (Shyoltozero, Shoksha, and Rybreka) comprising thirteen villages.

References

Geography of the Republic of Karelia
Vepsia